Byron Roberts (August 20, 1910, Brooklyn, New York – June 11, 2003, Beverly Hills, California), son of Moses L. and Esther Silverman, was a producer, production manager, second unit director and assistant director, most notably of Logan's Run (1976) and Baby Face Nelson (1957) with Mickey Rooney and Carolyn Jones. He was a frequent collaborator of low-budget producer Al Zimbalist.

Producer
The Gong Show Movie (1980) (co-producer) 
The Day the Lord Got Busted (1976) (associate producer) 
... aka Soul Hustler (USA) 
The Hard Ride (1971) (associate producer) 
Young Dillinger (1965) (associate producer) 
Valley of the Dragons (1961) (producer) 
... aka Prehistoric Valley (UK) 
Five Gates to Hell (1959) (associate producer)  
Baby Face Nelson (1957) (associate producer) 
From Hell It Came (1957) (associate producer) 
Sierra Stranger (1957) (associate producer) 
Hot Rod Girl (1956) (associate producer)

External links
Byron Roberts on Internet Movie Database 
Logan's Run trailer and promo on Turner Classic Movies 

Film producers from New York (state)
1910 births
2003 deaths
20th-century American Jews
People from Brooklyn
21st-century American Jews